Myriophyllum simulans is a species of water milfoil native to southeastern Australia where it grows in aquatic habitat such as ponds and streams, as well as muddy or swampy soil. Highly variable, it closely resembles M. variifolium.

References

simulans
Freshwater plants
Flora of New South Wales
Flora of South Australia
Flora of Tasmania
Plants described in 1986